Olympique Club Beaulieu shortened to OC Beaulieu is a football team from the city of Algiers and the neighborhood of same name east of El Harrach.

In the 2008–09 season the club participated in Ligue Inter-Régions de football, which was then the 3rd level of Algerian football league system , but was relegated to the lower level for the next season.

Now OCB is participating in the 5th level , Ligue Régional I after finishing 13th in 2014-2015 season.

References

External links
Ligue Régionale de football de Alger official site

Football clubs in Algeria